Eric T. Kool is an American chemist, focusing in chemistry of RNA and DNA; probe design and imaging; synthetic biology, currently the George A. and Hilda M. Daubert Professor in Chemistry at Stanford University and is an Elected Fellow at the American Association for the Advancement of Science. He received the Beckman Young Investigators Award in 1992.  He is the 2019 recipient of the Murray Goodman Memorial Prize

References

Year of birth missing (living people)
Living people
Stanford University faculty
21st-century American chemists
Synthetic biologists